The X Sporting Club, officially founded as Football Club X, was a football team based in Barcelona, Spain, which existed during the years 1902 and 1908. They won the Catalan championship three times in a row between 1905 and 1908. X Sporting Club is best remembered for its role in the founding of RCD Espanyol in 1909.

History
Established in March 1902 under the name of Football Club X, and in 1903 it occupied the football field of the newly defunct Irish FC at the Nou Velòdrom de Barcelona in Carrer Aragó.

As one of the oldest clubs in Catalonia, X Sporting Club was a member of the second inter-club competition held in the territory (after the Copa Macaya), the Barcelona Football Club Cup, although they withdrew from it presumably due to its still amateur preparation compared to other more established clubs. which came to win three times before disappearing in 1908 to form, together with the Spanish Jiu-Jitsu Club, the current Real Club Deportivo Espanyol.

X dominance
In 1906 Club Español de Football (now RCD Espanyol) had to suspend its activities due to a lack of players, since most of them were university students who enrolled to study at universities outside Catalonia. X Sporting Club took advantage of this as most of the remaining Español players joined them, which meant a big leap in quality for the club, and as a result, the X won the Catalan championship three times in a row between 1905 and 1908, beating the likes of FC Internacional, FC Barcelona and FC Català. This historic side had the likes of Pedro Gibert, José Irízar and Santiago Massana. Some victories were controversial, especially the last season, where the Catalan Federation, led by X director Isidre Lloret, was accused of favoritism towards his team. As regional champion, the X earned the opportunity to participate in the Copa del Rey, but declined its participation for three consecutive years.

In 1908 they settled on a new ground, the Campo de la Marina. The team's kit was a white shirt with an X on the chest and sometimes a black one as well.

Decline and collapse
It was not until 1909 that X and Español were restructured again. This period, from 1906 to 1909, when Español ceased its activities, is now considered an "impasse", and "The Incognitos", as the team was known, was nothing but a continuation. In 1909 when several of the former university students returned to Barcelona, with the idea of ​​refounding Club Español de Football, they contacted former members, most of whom were at X, and others in the Spanish Jiu-Jitsu Club. On 27 December 1908, after a meeting among all those involved, the merger of both entities took place, leading to the establishment of Club Deportiu Espanyol, which adopted the corporate structure of the X Sporting Club (which ceased to exist) as well as that club's colours of blue and white. This club was granted patronage by King Alfonso XIII and subsequently became known as the Real Club Deportivo Español, or RCD Espanyol.

Honours
Catalan championship
Champions (3): 1905–06, 1906–07 and 1907–08

Notes

References

Defunct football clubs in Catalonia
Association football clubs established in 1902
Association football clubs disestablished in 1908
1902 establishments in Spain
1908 disestablishments in Spain
Football clubs in Barcelona